Manu is a given name, often derived from Manuel, and also a surname. Notable people with the name include:

As a given name

Actors
Manu Bennett (born 1969), New Zealand actor, best known as "Crixus" on the television series Spartacus: Blood and Sand
Manu Intiraymi (born 1978), American actor, best known as "Icheb" on the television series Star Trek: Voyager
Manu Narayan (born 1973), American actor, and lead singer of the band DARUNAM
Manu Payet (born 1975), French actor, comedian, radio and television presenter
Manu Rishi (born 1971), Indian actor
Manu Tupou (1935–2004), American actor

Musicians
Manu Chao (born 1961), French-born singer and musician of Spanish origin
Manu Cornet (born 1981), French musician and writer
Manu Delago (born 1984), Austrian composer
Manu Dibango (1933–2020), Cameroonian musician
Manu Gavassi (born 1993), Brazilian recording artist, singer, actress
Manu Guix (born 1979), Spanish composer
Manu Katché (born 1958), French musician
Manu Koch (born 1972), Swiss pianist, keyboardist, and composer
Manu-L (born 1983), Swiss singer and guitarist
Manu Lanvin (born 1973), French singer
Manu Limbu, Nepali singer
Manu Louis, Belgian musician
Manu Militari (born 1979), Canadian singer
Manu Manzo (born 1994), American singer-songwriter
Manu Shrine (1987–2015), Russian electronic musician

Sports
Manú (Portuguese footballer) (born 1982), Portuguese footballer Emanuel Jesus Bonfim Evaristo
Manu (footballer, born 1984) (born 1984), Spanish footballer
Manuela Lareo (born 1992), Spanish footballer
Manu Ahotaeiloa (born 1986), Tongan rugby union player
Manu Attri (born 1992), Indian badminton player
Manu Barreiro (born 1986), Spanish association football player
Manu Balda (born 1992), Ecuadorian footballer
Manu Bhaker (born 2002), Indian sport shooter 
Manu Bhardwaj (born 1975), Indian cricketer
Manu Busto (born 1980), Spanish footballer
Manu Dagher (born 1984), Liberian-Dutch footballer
Manu Fernández (born 1986), Spanish football goalkeeper
Manu Ferrera (born 1958), Belgian association football player
Manu Garba (born 1965), Nigerian association football manager
Manu Ginóbili (born 1977), Argentine-born National Basketball Association player
Manu Herrera (born 1981), Spanish footballer
Manu Hervás (born 1986), Spanish association football player
Manu Honkanen (born 1996), Finnish ice hockey player
Manu Lecomte (born 1995), Belgian basketball player
Manu Leiataua (born 1986), Samoan rugby player
Manu Maniapoto (1935–2017), New Zealand rugby union player
Manu Ma'u (born 1988), New Zealand rugby league player
Manu Molina (born 1991), Spanish footballer
Manu del Moral (born 1984), Spanish footballer
Manu Morlanes (born 1999), Spanish association football player
Manu Nayyar (born 1964), Indian cricketer
Manu Rodríguez (born 1991), Spanish basketball player
Manu Sánchez (footballer, born 1979), Spanish footballer
Manu Shlomovich (1927–2000), Israeli association football player
Manu Snellinx (born 1948), Belgian cyclist 
Manu Sunu (born 1966), Togolese footballer
Manu Torres (born 1989), Spanish footballer
Manu Trigueros (born 1991), Spanish footballer
Manu Tuiasosopo (born 1957), National Football League defensive lineman
Manu Tuilagi (born 1991), Samoan-born rugby player for England
Manu Vallejo (born 1997), Spanish footballer
Manu Vatuvei (born 1986), New Zealand rugby league player
Manu Vunipola (rugby union, born 1967), Tongan rugby union footballer and coach

Other
Afa Anoa'i Jr. (born 1984), American professional wrestler who used the ring name Manu
Manu (Kannada author) (1951–2011), Kannada author
Manu Ayerdi (born 1967), Basque economist
Manu Baligar, Indian writer
Manu Bhandari (born 1931), Indian author
Manu Bhattathiri, Indian author
Manuhuia Bennett, New Zealand bishop
Manu Beuselinck (born 1970), Belgian politician
Manu Brabo (born 1981), Spanish photographer
Manu Chandaria (born 1929), Kenyan businessman
Manu Chhabria (1946–2002), Indian businessman
Manu Crooks (born 1993), Ghanaian-Australian artist
Manu Daftary, American money manager
Manu Farrarons (born 1967), French artist
Manu Feildel, French-born chef living in Australia
Manu Herbstein, South African author of Ama, a Story of the Atlantic Slave Trade
Manu Joseph (born 1974), Indian journalist and writer
Manu Korovulavula, Fijian political leader and civil servant
Manu Leumann, German philologist
Manu Majumdar, Bangladeshi politician
Manu Manjith (born 1986), Indian lyricist and poet
Manu Parekh (born 1939), Indian painter
Manu S. Pillai (born 1990), Indian historian and author
Manu Pineda, Spanish politician
Manu Platt (born 1980), American biomedical engineer
Manu Pluton (born 1942), French bodybuilder
Manu Prakash, Indian biophysicist
Manu Raju (born 1980), American-Indian journalist
Manu Ramesan, Malayalee film composer
Manu Sareen (born 1968), Indian social worker
Manu Sharma (born 1977), Indian criminal
Manu Singh (born 1983), Indian activist
Manu Toigo (born 1969), Australian television personality

As a surname
Gabriel Manu (born 1981), Romanian footballer 
Gheorghe Manu (1833–1911), Romanian army general and politician
Ioan Manu (1803–1874), Romanian boyar and politician
Puiu Manu (born 1928), Romanian graphic designer 

Masculine given names